Serra is a titular see of the Roman Catholic Church .

It goes back to a defunct bishopric in the ancient city Serra in the Roman province of Africa proconsularis (today in northern Tunisia). The bishopric was in the ecclesiastical province of Carthage.

The Holy See identifies the titular see as "Serrensi in Proconsulari" as well as "Serra".

References

Notes

External links
Entry ay gcatholic.org
 Apostolische Nachfolge – Titularsitze 

Catholic titular sees in Africa